Javier Aponte Dalmau is a Puerto Rican politician affiliated with the Popular Democratic Party (PPD). He was elected to the Puerto Rico House of Representatives in 2012 to represent District 38. Has a bachelor's degree in business administration with a concentration in finance from the University of Puerto Rico. Master in Business Administration with a concentration in finance from the Interamerican University of Puerto Rico. Earned a Juris Doctor from the Pontifical Catholic University of Puerto Rico School of Law.

References

External links
Javier Aponte Dalmau on WAPA-TV

|-

1971 births
Interamerican University of Puerto Rico alumni
Living people
Members of the Senate of Puerto Rico
Pontifical Catholic University of Puerto Rico alumni
Popular Democratic Party members of the House of Representatives of Puerto Rico
University of Puerto Rico alumni